Colonel Sir Ernest Edward "Weary" Dunlop,  (12 July 1907 – 2 July 1993) was an Australian surgeon who was renowned for his leadership while being held prisoner by the Japanese during World War II.

Early life and family
Dunlop was born in Wangaratta, Victoria, the second of two children of parents James and Alice. He attended Benalla High School for two years of his education. He started an apprenticeship in pharmacy when he finished school, and moved to Melbourne in 1927. There, he studied at the Victorian College of Pharmacy and then the University of Melbourne, where he obtained a scholarship in medicine. Dunlop graduated from the University of Melbourne in 1934 with first class honours in pharmacy and in medicine, and excelled as a sportsman at Melbourne University and Ormond College. The nickname "Weary" was a reference to his last name—"tired" like a Dunlop tyre.

Rugby union career

Although brought up playing Australian Rules football, when at university – and although still playing "Aussie Rules", as a ruckman for Ormond College  – Dunlop took up rugby union; commencing as a fourth grade player with the Melbourne University Rugby Club in 1931. He rapidly progressed through the grades, to state, and then to the national representative level, becoming the first Victorian-born player to represent the Wallabies.

He made his national representative debut against the All Blacks at the Sydney Cricket Ground on 23 July 1932 as a number 8.

In the first Test of 1934 he again appeared for Australia, this time as a lock Australia won the match 25–11. Dunlop had broken his nose in a head clash in the Melbourne University boxing championships on 3 August 1934, and it was broken again in the first five minutes of the match.

Two weeks later the second and final match of that year's Bledisloe Cup series finished in a draw; and, although Dunlop missed that match – he was one of a number of players from both teams who were victims of influenza – he stands as a member of the first Wallaby squad to have won the Bledisloe Cup away from New Zealand.

In June 2008, he was honoured in the third set of inductees into the Australian Rugby Union Hall of Fame. To date, he is the only Victorian so honoured.

Pre-war career

Dunlop had been a school cadet, and he continued his part-time army service until 1929, when his service ceased under pressure from his pharmacy studies. He re-enlisted in 1935 and was commissioned into the Australian Army Medical Corps on 1 July with the rank of captain. In May 1938 Dunlop left Australia for London on a ship, where he served as her medical officer. In London he attended St Bartholomew's Medical School and in 1938 became a Fellow of the Royal College of Surgeons. The distinguished medical mentors Dunlop met in London, Professor Grey-Turner and Sir Thomas Dunhill, impressed him with their dedication to their job and he resolved to emulate their example.

War and imprisonment
During World War II, Dunlop was appointed to medical headquarters in the Middle East, where he developed the mobile surgical unit. In Greece he liaised with forward medical units and Allied headquarters, and at Tobruk he was a surgeon until the Australian Divisions were withdrawn for home defence. His troopship was diverted to Java in an ill-planned attempt to bolster the defences there. On 26 February 1942, he was promoted to temporary lieutenant-colonel. Dunlop became a Japanese prisoner of war in 1942 when he was captured in Bandung, Java, together with the hospital he was commanding.

Because of his leadership skills, he was placed in charge of prisoner-of-war camps in Java, and was later transferred briefly to Changi, and in January 1943 commanded the first Australians sent to work on the Thai segment of the Burma-Thailand railway where prisoners of the Japanese were being used as forced labourers to construct a strategically important supply route between Bangkok and Rangoon. Conditions in the railway camps were primitive and horrific—food was totally inadequate, beatings were frequent and severe, there were no medical supplies, tropical diseases were rampant, and the Japanese required a level of productivity that would have been difficult for fully fit and properly equipped men to achieve.

Along with a number of other Commonwealth Medical Officers, Dunlop's dedication and heroism became a legend among prisoners. A courageous leader and compassionate doctor, he restored morale in those terrible prison camps and jungle hospitals. Dunlop defied his captors, gave hope to the sick and eased the anguish of the dying. His example was one of the reasons why Australian survival rates were the highest.

He became, in the words of one of his men, the author Donald Stuart, "a lighthouse of sanity in a universe of madness and suffering".

He is depicted in a lighter moment during these terrible times on a birthday card painted by Ashley George Old for Major Arthur Moon and now held at the State Library of Victoria.

Post-war life
After 1945, with the darkness of the war years behind him, Dunlop forgave his captors and turned his energies to the task of healing and building. He was to state later that " in suffering we are all equal". He devoted himself to the health and welfare of former prisoners-of-war and their families, and worked to promote better relations between Australia and Asia.

He was active in many spheres of endeavour. He became closely involved with a wide range of health and educational organisations, and served as President of the Australian Drug Foundation for 13 years, and also on the board of Cancer Council Victoria. He was the first Australian Patron of St. Andrew's Ambulance Association (now St. Andrew's First Aid). His tireless community work had a profound influence on Australians and on the people of Asia. As well as numerous tributes and distinctions bestowed upon him in his own country, he received honours from Thailand, India, Sri Lanka, and the United Kingdom.

Dunlop was a Freemason.

Honours and awards
'Weary' Dunlop received many honours and awards throughout his life, including: 
 Officer of the Order of the British Empire (1947)
 Companion of the Order of St Michael and St George (1965)
 Knight Bachelor (1969)
 named Australian of the Year 1976
 Companion of the Order of Australia (1987)
 Knight Commander of the Order of St John of Jerusalem (Knights Hospitaller) of the Order of St John of Jerusalem (1992)
 Knight Grand Cross (1st Class) of the Most Noble Order of the Royal Crown of Thailand (1993)
 Fellow of the Royal College of Surgeons of England
 Fellow of the Royal Australasian College of Surgeons
 Honorary Fellow of the Imperial College London
 Honorary Fellow of the Royal College of Surgeons of Edinburgh
 Honorary Life Member of the Returned and Services League of Australia
 Life Governor of the Royal Women's Hospital and the Royal Victorian Eye and Ear Hospital.

In 1988 'Weary' Dunlop was named one of '200 Great Australians'. In June 2008, he was honoured in the third set of inductees into the Australian Rugby Union Hall of Fame.

He received the posthumous honour of having the Canberra suburb of Dunlop named after him shortly after his death in 1993. His image is on the 1995 issue Australian fifty cent piece with the words "They Served Their Country in World War II, 1939 – 1945". The fifty cent piece is part of a set including the one dollar coin and the twenty cent piece. He has a platoon named after him in the Army Recruit Training Centre, Blamey Barracks, Kapooka. Weary Dunlop Platoon is a holding platoon to recruits that want to leave recruit training.

He was on one of 1995 Australia Remembers 45c stamps.

Footnotes

References 

 Gvozdic, Jelena (2012), "Sir Ernest Edward “Weary” Dunlop: Archival Snapshot", Public Record Office Victoria, 31 January 2012.
 College of Pharmacy, The Argus, (Thursday, 3 February 1927), p.6.
 Pharmacy College Opens for 1929, The Herald, (Wednesday, 6 February 1929), p.8.
 Successful High School Boy, The Benalla Standard, (Friday, 17 December 1926), p.2.
 'The Watchman', "Sport Eddies", The Herald, Thursday, 9 August 1934), p.39.
 Degrees Conferred at University: Bachelor of Medicine and Bachelor of Surgery, The Herald, (Saturday, 22 December 1934), p.16.
 National Archives of Australia: Prisoner of War Record: Edward Ernest Dunlop (VX 259).
 National Archives of Australia: World War II Service Record: Edward Ernest Dunlop (VX 259).
 Lighthouse of Sanity in Universe of Madness (Editorial), The Canberra Times, (Sunday, 4 July 1993), p.10.
 The Knight Who Forgave His Tormentors (Obituary), The Canberra Times, (Saturday, 3 July 1993), p.16.
 Biographical Note: Sir (Ernest) Edward "Weary" Dunlop, Memorial Encyclopedia: Australian War Memorial.
 Dunlop, E.E., The War Diaries of Weary Dunlop: Java and the Burma-Thailand Railway, 1942-1945, Nelson, (Melbourne), 1986. 
 Ebury, Sue, Weary: The Life of Sir Edward Dunlop, Viking, (Ringwood), 1994. 
 Edwards, H., Sir Edward 'Weary' Dunlop, New Frontier Publishing, (Frenchs Forest), 2011. 
 
 
 Wells, K., "'Weary' Dunlop and the Burma Railway", Australian Stories, Australia.gov.au, 2013.

External links
 
 Australian War Memorial Site
 Biography at Sir Edward "Weary" Dunlop Medical Research Foundation
  Biography and timeline at Melbourne University Rugby Club]
 "Some Inspirational People" Profiled by Laurence MacDonald Muir.
 Pictured on a birthday card for Major Moon

1907 births
1993 deaths
People from Benalla
People from Wangaratta
Australian Army personnel of World War II
Australian colonels
Australian surgeons
Australian prisoners of war
World War II prisoners of war held by Japan
Australian of the Year Award winners
Companions of the Order of Australia
Australian Companions of the Order of St Michael and St George
Australian Knights Bachelor
Australian Officers of the Order of the British Empire
Knights of the Order of St John
Australian rugby union players
Australia international rugby union players
Fellows of the Royal College of Surgeons
Melbourne Medical School alumni
Rugby players and officials awarded knighthoods
Australian military doctors
Burma Railway prisoners
Rugby union players from Victoria (Australia)